The Philippine House Committee on Constitutional Amendments, or House Constitutional Amendments Committee is a standing committee of the Philippine House of Representatives.

Jurisdiction 
As prescribed by House Rules, the committee's jurisdiction is on the amendments or revisions of the Constitution of the Philippines.

Members, 18th Congress

See also 
 House of Representatives of the Philippines
 List of Philippine House of Representatives committees
 Constitutional reform in the Philippines

References

External links 
House of Representatives of the Philippines

Constitutional Amendments